Vertigo arthuri is a species of land snail in the family Vertiginidae, the whorl snails. It is known by the common name callused vertigo.  

It is native to North America.
 Michigan
 Wisconsin

A 2009 phylogenetic analysis of genus Vertigo revealed that many of its species should be included in the circumscription of V. arthuri. This greatly expanded the range of V. arthuri, which is now considered to have a disjunct distribution spanning from Alaska to Newfoundland to New Mexico. V. arthuri now includes many snails that were formerly considered to be rare local endemics of the American Midwest. It now has one of the largest ranges of any land snail in the Western Hemisphere.

In many areas, this snail lives in various types of forest habitat. It consumes leaf litter and organic layers on rock surfaces.

Description
(Described as Vertigo gouldii hubrichti) The shell is subcylindric, larger than Vertigo nylanderi Sterki, 1909 with a similar long and deep impression over the palatal folds. The lower-palatal is deeply immersed. There is no angular lamella. The basal fold is well developed. The intermediate whorls are strongly, sharply striate

References

External links

 Martens, E. von. (1882). Vorlage einiger Conchylien, welche Dr. Aurel und Arthur Krause während ihrer Rückreise von des stillen Oceans durch Amerika gesammelt haben. Sitzungsberichte der Gesellschaft Naturforschender Freunde zu Berlin. 1882(9): 138-143
 Nylander, O. O. (1900). A list of shells from northeastern Maine. The Nautilus. 13(9): 102-106
 Leonard, A.B. (1972). New gastropods from the Pleistocene of Illinois. The Nautilus. 85(3): 78-84.
 Pilsbry, H. A. & Vanatta, E. G. (1900). A partial revision of the Pupae of the United States. Proceedings of the Academy of Natural Sciences of Philadelphia. 52: 582-611,

Molluscs of Canada
Molluscs of the United States
arthuri
Gastropods described in 1882